This is the list of major streets in Tallinn, Estonia. The list is incomplete.

See also
List of streets in Narva
List of streets in Pärnu
List of streets in Tartu

References

External links 
 All street names of Tallinn, eki.ee

Streets in Estonia
Tallinn
Tallinn-related lists
Tallinn